Andre Agassi was the defending champion, but did not participate that year.Brad Gilbert won the title, defeating Christo van Rensburg 6–2, 6–1, in the final.

Seeds

  Brad Gilbert (champion)
  Aaron Krickstein (second round, withdrew)
  Christo van Rensburg (final)
  Scott Davis (quarterfinals)
  Glenn Layendecker (second round)
  Jimmy Arias (first round)
  Veli Paloheimo (first round, retired)
  Ramesh Krishnan (second round)

Draw

Finals

Top half

Bottom half

References
General

Singles